Jacqueline Hazel "Jackie" Tabick (born 1948, née Jacqueline Acker) is a British Reform rabbi. She became Britain's first female rabbi in 1975. She is convenor of the Movement for Reform Judaism's Beit Din, the first woman in the role, and until its closure in 2022 was also Rabbi of West Central Liberal Synagogue in Bloomsbury, central London.

Early life and training

Born in Dublin, Tabick spent most of her early life in England and grew up in the community of South West Essex & Settlement Reform Synagogue. After reading Medieval History for her degree at University College London, she enrolled at the Leo Baeck College where she completed her rabbinical training. She graduated to become Britain's first female rabbi in 1975.

Rabbinical life
Starting as the assistant rabbi at West London Synagogue under Rabbi Hugo Gryn, she left in 1998 to become the rabbi of North West Surrey Synagogue. She held this position until July 2013, combining it with her role, since 2012, as the first female convenor of the Reform Movement's Beit Din. She has previously been the Movement's vice-president and is patron of the Jewish Council for Racial Equality (JCORE). She currently leads services at London's West Central Liberal Synagogue.

Tabick has played a leading role in interfaith initiatives. She is an executive of The Inter Faith Network. She was, for many years, chair of the World Congress of Faiths and is now co-president.

Family life

She has been married to Rabbi Larry Tabick since 1975 and was the first female rabbi to marry a rabbi. Born in Brooklyn, New York in 1947, Larry came to England to study at the Leo Baeck College in the early 1970s and retired as rabbi of Shir Hayim in Hampstead in 2017. He and Jackie have three children, one of whom, Roni Tabick, is rabbi of the Masorti synagogue New Stoke Newington Shul in Stoke Newington, London.

Other
The art exhibit “Holy Sparks”, which opened in February 2022 at the Heller Museum and the Skirball Museum, featured 24 Jewish women artists, who had each created an artwork about a female rabbi who was a first in some way. Sandy Bleifer created the artwork about Tabick.

References

External links
 North West Surrey Synagogue profile of Jackie Tabick
 

1948 births
Living people
20th-century British rabbis
21st-century British rabbis
Alumni of Leo Baeck College
Alumni of University College London
British Reform rabbis
Irish emigrants to Great Britain
People in interfaith dialogue
West London Synagogue
Reform women rabbis